North Korean standard language or  is the North Korean standard version of the Korean language. Munhwaŏ was adopted as the standard in 1966. The adopting proclamation stated that the Pyongan dialect spoken in the North Korean capital Pyongyang and its surroundings should be the basis for Munhwaŏ; however, in practice, Iksop Lee and S. Robert Ramsey report that Munhwaŏ remains "firmly rooted" in the Seoul dialect, which had been the national standard for centuries. Most differences between the North and South Korean standards are thus attributable to replacement of Sino-Korean vocabulary and other loanwords with pure Korean words, or the Northern ideological preference for "the speech of the working class" which includes some words considered non-standard in the South.

Background 
Following the liberation of Korea in 1945, The Democratic People's Republic of Korea continued to follow the Korean language guidelines as defined by the Korean Language Society in 1933 with the "Proposal for Unified Korean Orthography" and in 1936 with the "Collection of Assessed Standard Korean Words". In 1954, the 1933 proposal was replaced by a new system by the North Korean government in which thirteen words were slightly modified. Although the reformation created little difference, from this point the languages spoken by people on both sides on the Korean peninsula only grew in difference.

During the emergence of the Juche idea in the 1960s, Kim Il-sung coordinated an effort to purify the Korean language from English, Japanese, and Russian loanwords as well as words with less common Hancha characters, replacing them with new words derived from native Korean words. In a lecture by Kim Il-sung on 3 January 1964, titled "Some problems to develop the Korean language", he emphasized the significance of the usage of language as a weapon in the socialist construction of all areas of development, and tried to align with the global trend of change as well as preserving ethnic uniqueness.

Thus, North Korea began to refer to its own dialect as "cultural language" as a reference to its return to words of Korean cultural origin, in juxtaposition to South Korea's reference to its own dialect as "standard language".

See also 

 North–South differences in the Korean language

References 

Korea, North
Korean dialects
Korean language in North Korea